Helena Falls is a waterfall in the Fiordland National Park in New Zealand that empties into Doubtful Sound. A walking track from the road end at Doubtful Sound goes to the base of the waterfall. They are named after Helene Fels (1882–1914).

Gallery

See also
Waterfalls of New Zealand

References

External links
Helena Falls Track at the Department of Conservation

Waterfalls of Fiordland